Parahyllisia is a genus of beetles in the family Cerambycidae, containing the following species:

 Parahyllisia annamensis Breuning, 1942
 Parahyllisia indica Breuning, 1974

References

Agapanthiini